The Lafarge Foot Avenir, also known as Tournoi de Limoges, is a football competition contested by national youth teams (and club youth teams) in Limoges, France, and held annually since 2007.

History

Honours

Current Competition (2021)
Matches were played between 1 and 5 September 2021 at the Stade Beaublanc.

Past Competitions

2007

2008

2009

2010

2011

2012

2013

2014

2015

All matches were played at the Stade Beaublanc.

2016

All matches were played at the Stade Beaublanc.

2017

All matches were played at the Stade Beaublanc.

2018

All matches were played at the Stade Beaublanc.

2019

Matches were played between 4 and 8 September 2019 at the Stade Beaublanc.

2020

Tournament cancelled due to Covid-19.

External links
Official website

References

International association football competitions hosted by France
Recurring sporting events established in 2007
Youth association football competitions for international teams
2015–16 in French football